Çaldaş (also, Chaldash) is a village and municipality in the Gadabay Rayon of Azerbaijan.  It has a population of 1,772.  The municipality consists of the villages of Çaldaş and Səbətkeçməz.

References 

Populated places in Gadabay District